The Yemen Times was an independent English-language newspaper in Yemen. The paper was published twice weekly.

History and profile
Yemen Times was founded in 1991 by Abdulaziz Al-Saqqaf, a leading economist and human rights activist, who was also its editor and publisher until he died in a traffic accident in 1999. In the paper's mission statement, he wrote that: "We use the Yemen Times to make Yemen a good world citizen." The paper is based in Sana'a.

As of 2007, Nadia Al-Sakkaf was the editor-in-chief of the daily. The paper has offices and correspondents all over the country. It supports press freedom, respect for human rights, political pluralism and democracy. It promotes non-governmental organizations (NGOs) and other forms of civil-society organizations. At the economic front, it supports liberalization and open interaction with other nations. The paper and its editor were awarded the NPC's International Award for Freedom of the Press for 1995. In 2004, managing editor Iona Craig won the Martha Gellhorn Prize for her work with the paper. The paper also won the Free Media Pioneer Award by the International Press Institute in 2006.

The first national English-language Yemeni newspapers were published in 1960s in Aden. These were Aden Chronicle by Mohammed Ali Luqmān and The Recorder by Muhmmad Bā-Sharāhīl. The publication of these and their sister Arabic-language newspapers Fatāt ul-Jazīrah and Al-Ayyam ceased when the National Front for the Liberation of South Yemen (NLF) took power in the then People's Republic of South Yemen, (PRSY) (later known as the People's Democratic Republic of Yemen, PDRY) in 1967. The publication of  Al-'Ayyam was resumed after the unification of the two sectors of Yemen in 1990.

During the Yemeni Civil War in 2015, the newspaper was unable to continue issuing the printed version of the newspaper and deemed defunct. The website says that it "hopes to resume when conditions permit."

See also
Media of Yemen

Notes

References

External links
Official website
 For a book review on Nushou' wa Tatawur Al-Sahafa fi Adan (the burgeoning and development of journalism in Aden), 1937–1967, by Abdulrahman Khobara (175 pages, published by Al-Amal for Printing and Publishing), see Yemen Times

1991 establishments in Yemen
English-language newspapers published in Arab countries
Mass media in Sanaa
Defunct newspapers published in Yemen
Publications established in 1991
2015 disestablishments in Asia